Alexander 'Sasha' Pechersky (22 February 1909 – 19 January 1990) was one of the organizers, and the leader, of the most successful uprising and mass-escape of Jews from a Nazi extermination camp  during World War II, which occurred at the Sobibor extermination camp on 14 October 1943.

In 1948, Pechersky was arrested by the Soviet authorities along with his brother during the countrywide Rootless cosmopolitan campaign against Jews suspected of pro-Western leanings but released later due in part to mounting international pressure. Pechersky was prevented by the Soviet government from leaving the country to testify in international trials related to Sobibor, including the Eichmann Trial in Israel; foreign investigators were only allowed to collect his testimony under KGB supervision. The last time he was refused permission to exit the country and testify was in 1987, for a trial in Poland.

Pre-war life and career
Pechersky, a son of a Jewish lawyer, was born on 22 February 1909 in Kremenchuk, Poltava Governorate, Russian Empire (now Ukraine). In 1915, his family moved to Rostov-on-Don where he eventually worked as an electrician at a locomotive repair factory. After graduating from university with a diploma in music and literature, he became an accountant and manager of a small school for amateur musicians.

World War II
On 22 June 1941, the day when Germany invaded the Soviet Union, Pechersky was conscripted into the Soviet Red Army with a rank of junior lieutenant. By September 1941, he was promoted to the rank of lieutenant quartermaster (class II). In the early autumn of 1941, he rescued his wounded commander from being captured by the Germans. He did not receive any medals for this deed. One of his fellow soldiers reportedly said: "Sasha, if what you've done doesn't make you a hero, I don't know who is!" In October 1941, during the Battle of Moscow, their unit was surrounded and captured by the Germans in the city of Vyazma, Smolensk Oblast.

Captured, Pechersky soon contracted typhus, but survived the seven-month-long illness. In May 1942, he escaped along with four other prisoners of war, but they were all recaptured the same day. He was then sent to a penal camp at Borisov, Belarus, and from there to a prisoner of war (POW) camp located in the forest next to the city of Minsk. During a mandatory medical examination it was discovered that he was circumcised. Pechersky recalled a German medical officer asking him: "Do you admit to being a Jew?" He admitted it, since any denial would result in a whipping, and was thrown into a cellar called "the Jewish grave" along with other Jewish prisoners of war, where for 10 days he sat in complete darkness, being fed 100 grams (3.5 oz) of wheat and a cup of water every second day.

On 20 August 1942 Pechersky was sent to a SS-operated Arbeitslager, a work camp, in Minsk. The camp housed 500 Jews from the Minsk Ghetto, as well as Jewish Soviet POWs; there were also between 200–300 Soviet inmates whom the Germans labeled as incorrigible: people who were suspected of contacting the Soviet partisans and those who were repeatedly truant while working for the Germans. The prisoners were starved and worked from dawn till dusk. Pechersky wrote about the Minsk work camp:

Sobibor extermination camp
On 18 September 1943, Pechersky, along with 2,000 Jews from Minsk including about 100 Soviet Jewish POWs, was placed in a railway cattle wagon which arrived at the Sobibor extermination camp on 23 September 1943. Eighty prisoners from the train, including Pechersky, were selected for work in Lager II. The remaining 1,920 Jews were immediately led to the gas chambers. Pechersky later recalled his thoughts as the train pulled up to Sobibor, "How many circles of hell were there in Dante's Inferno? It seems there were nine. How many have already passed? Being surrounded, being captured, camps in Vyazma, Smolensk, Borisov, Minsk... And finally I am here. What's next?" The appearance of Soviet POWs produced an enormous impression on Sobibor prisoners: "hungry hope-filled eyes following their every move".

Pechersky wrote about his first day in Sobibor:

During his third day at Sobibor, Alexander Pechersky earned the respect of fellow prisoners by standing up to Karl Frenzel, an SS senior officer, as the incident was recalled by Leon Feldhendler.

Escape plan
Pechersky's plan merged the idea of a mass escape with vengeance: to help as many prisoners as possible to escape while executing SS officers and guards. His final goal was to join up with the partisans and continue fighting the Nazis. Five days after arriving at Sobibor, Pechersky was again approached by Solomon Leitman on behalf of Feldhendler, the leader of the camp's Polish Jews. Leitman was one of the few prisoners who understood Russian and Pechersky did not speak either Yiddish or Polish. Pechersky was invited to talk with a group of Jewish prisoner leaders from Poland, to whom he spoke about the Red Army victory in the Battle of Stalingrad and partisan victories. When one of the prisoners asked him why the partisans would not rescue them from Sobibor, Pechersky reportedly replied: "What for? To free us all? The partisans have their hands full already. Nobody will do our job for us."

The Jewish prisoners who had worked at the Bełżec extermination camp were sent to Sobibor to be exterminated when Bełżec closed. From a note found among the clothing of the murdered, the Sobibor prisoners learned that those who had been killed were from work groups in the Bełżec camp. The note said: "We worked for a year in Belzec. I don't know where they're taking us now. They say to Germany. In the freight cars there are dining tables. We received bread for three days, and tins and liquor. If all this is a lie, then know that death awaits you too. Do not trust the Germans. Avenge our blood!"

The leadership of the Polish Jews was aware that Bełżec and Treblinka had been closed, dismantled and all remaining prisoners had been sent to the gas-chambers and they suspected that Sobibor would be next. There was a great urgency in coming up with a good escape plan and Pechersky, with his army experience, was their best hope. The escape had to also coincide with the time when the Sobibor's deputy commandant, Gustav Wagner, went on vacation, since the prisoners felt that he was sharp enough to uncover the escape plan.

Luka
Pechersky clandestinely met with Feldhendler under the guise of meeting Luka, a woman he was supposedly involved with. However, records indicate she was in fact a 28 year old married woman from Germany who was accompanied by her husband, which raised doubt about her being the same Luka. After the war, Pechersky insisted that the relationship was platonic. Her fate after the escape was never established and she was never seen alive again. During an interview with Thomas Blatt, Pechersky said the following regarding Luka: "Although I knew her only about two weeks, I will never forget her. I informed her minutes before the escape of the plan. She has given me a shirt. She said, 'it's a good luck shirt, put it on right now', and I did. It's now in the museum. I lost her in the turmoil of the revolt and never saw her again."

The uprising
According to Pechersky's plan, the prisoners would assassinate the German SS staff, leaving the auxiliary guards leaderless, obtain weapons and kill the remaining guards. Jewish Poles were assigned German SS guards that they were supposed to lure inside the workshops under some pretext and silently kill. Ester Raab, a survivor of the escape, recalled: "The plan was, at 4 o’clock (pm), should start (the escape), everybody has to kill his SS man, and his guard at his place of work". Only a small circle of trusted Jewish Pole inmates were aware of the escape plan as they did not trust the Jews from other European countries.

On 14 October 1943, Pechersky's escape plan began. During the day, several German SS men were lured to workshops on a variety of pretexts, such as being fitted for new boots or expensive clothes. The SS men were then stabbed to death with carpenters' axes, awls and chisels discreetly recovered from property left by gassed Jews; with other tradesmen's sharp tools or with crude knives and axes made in the camp's machine shop. The blood was covered up with sawdust on the floor. The escapees were armed with a number of hand grenades, a rifle, a submachine gun and several pistols that the prisoners stole from the German living quarters, as well as the sidearms captured from the dead SS men. Earlier in the day, SS-Oberscharführer Erich Bauer, at the top of the death list created by Pechersky, unexpectedly drove out to Chełm for supplies. The uprising was almost postponed since the prisoners believed that Bauer's death was necessary for the success of the escape. Bauer came back early from Chełm, discovered that SS-Scharführer Rudolf Beckmann had been assassinated and began shooting at the prisoners. The sound of the gunfire prompted Alexander Pechersky to begin the revolt earlier than planned. Pechersky screamed the code-words: "Hurrah, the revolt has begun!"

Disorganized groups of prisoners ran in every direction. Ada Lichtman, a survivor of the escape recalled "Suddenly we heard shots... Mines started to explode. Riot and confusion prevailed, everything was thundering around. The doors of the workshop were opened, and everyone rushed through... We ran out of the workshop. All around were the bodies of the dead and wounded". Pechersky was able to escape into the woods and at the end of the uprising, eleven German SS personnel and an unknown number of Ukrainian guards had been killed. Out of approximately 550 Jewish prisoners at the Sobibor death camp, 130 chose not to participate in the uprising and remained in the camp; about 80 were killed during the escape either by machine gun fire from watchtowers or while running through a mine field in the camp's outer perimeter; 170 more were recaptured by the Nazis during searches. All who remained in the camp or caught after the escape were executed. 53 Sobibor escapees survived the war. Within days after the uprising, the SS chief Heinrich Himmler ordered the camp closed, dismantled and planted with trees.

Aftermath
Immediately after the escape, in the forest, a group of fifty prisoners followed Pechersky. After some time, Pechersky informed the Jewish Poles that he, along with a few Jewish Red Army soldiers would enter the nearby village and then shortly return with food. They allegedly collected all the money (Pechersky implies the money collection is a fabricated detail) and weapons except one rifle but never came back. In 1980, Thomas Blatt asked Pechersky why he abandoned the other survivors. Pechersky answered,

Pechersky, along with two other escapees, wandered the forests until they ran into Yakov Biskowitz and another Sobibor escapee. Biskowitz testified at the Eichmann Trial regarding the meeting,

The two Russian Jewish soldiers who Yahov Biskowitz met with Pechersky were Alexander Shubayev (who was responsible for killing SS-Untersturmführer Johann Niemann and was later killed fighting the Germans) and Arkady Moishejwicz Wajspapier (who was responsible for killing SS-Oberscharführer Siegfried Graetschus and Volksdeutscher Ivan Klatt, survived the war). For over a year, Pechersky fought with the Yehiel's Group partisans as a demolition expert and later with the Soviet group of Voroshilov Partisans, until the Red Army drove out the Germans from Belarus.

As an escaped POW, Pechersky was conscripted into a special penal battalions, conforming to Stalin's Order No. 270 and was sent to the front to fight German forces in some of the toughest engagements of the war. Pechersky's battalion commander, Major Andreev, was so shocked by his description of Sobibor that he permitted Pechersky to go to Moscow and speak to the Commission of Inquiry of the Crimes of Fascist-German Aggressors and their Accomplices. The Commission listened to Pechersky and published the report Uprising in Sobibor based on his testimony. This report was included in the Black Book, one of the first comprehensive compilations about the Holocaust, written by Vasily Grossman and Ilya Ehrenburg.

For fighting the Germans as part of the penal battalions, Pechersky was promoted to the rank of captain and received a medal for bravery. He was eventually discharged after a serious foot injury. In a hospital in Moscow, he was introduced to his future wife, Olga Kotova.

After the war

After the war, Pechersky returned to Rostov-on-Don, where he lived before the war and started work as administrator in an operetta theater. The mass murder of Jews at the Sobibor death camp became part of the charges against leading Nazis at the Nuremberg Trials. The International Tribunal at Nuremberg wanted to call Pechersky as a witness but the Soviet government would not allow him to travel to Germany to testify. In 1948, during Stalin's persecution of Jews, known as the 'Rootless cosmopolitan' campaign targeting those who allegedly lacked true loyalty and commitment to Stalinism and the Soviet Union, Pechersky lost his job and was briefly arrested. He was quickly released because of international pressure.

Despite having lost his job because of repressions, he was awarded a medal "For Battle Merit" in 1949. He had to sell handcrafted clothes on the local market for five years because he could not find a job. Only after Stalin's death in 1953 could he find a job, in the Rostselmash factory. His brother, however, succumbed to a diabetic coma while incarcerated. Pechersky also worked for a short time at a small cinema as a director.

The Soviet government prevented Pechersky from testifying at the Eichmann Trial in Israel, only allowing a short deposition in Moscow which was controlled by the KGB. In 1963, he appeared as a witness during the Soviet trial of eleven former Ukrainian guards at Sobibor, all of whom were convicted and ten of whom were executed.

According to his daughter in an interview, Pechersky was prevented by the Soviet government from testifying in international trials related to Sobibor. The final time Pechersky was refused permission to leave the country and testify was in 1987 for a trial in Poland and according to his daughter, this refusal "just crippled my father. He almost stopped getting out of bed and instantly aged".

Alexander Pechersky died on 19 January 1990 and was buried at the Northern cemetery in Rostov-on-Don, Russia. In 2009, Pechersky's daughter, granddaughter and two great-grandsons were living in Rostov-on-Don.

Remembrance

Alexander Pechersky features prominently in a Dutch-Soviet documentary Revolt in Sobibor (1989) by director Pavel Kogan. An award-winning documentary about the escape was made by Claude Lanzmann, entitled Sobibor, 14 Octobre 1943, 16 heures.

The revolt was also dramatized in the 1987 British TV film Escape from Sobibor, in which Rutger Hauer received a Golden Globe Award for Best Actor in a Supporting Role (Television) for his portrayal of Pechersky. Pechersky did not attend the premiere of the film; his widow later stated that the Soviet government denied him permission to travel to the United States.

In 2007, 17 years after his death, a small memorial plaque was placed on the side of the building where he lived in Rostov-on-Don. One of the schools of Rostov-on-Don, school 52 was named after him and a monument near the school was erected in 2018.

The New England Holocaust Memorial bears his name alongside a quote. Streets have been named in his honor in Safed, Israel, and in Moscow and Rostov-on-Don, Russia. A stone memorial was erected in Tel Aviv more recently.

In 2013, Alexander Pechersky was posthumously awarded the Knight's Cross of the Order of Merit of the Republic of Poland. In January 2016, he was posthumously awarded the Russian Order of Courage by decree of Vladimir Putin.

Konstantin Khabensky directed and played the role of Pechersky in the 2018 film Sobibor.

See also
 Sobibor extermination camp
 German mistreatment of Soviet prisoners of war

References

External links
 Revolt in Sobibor (1989/2011) - Dutch-Russian award-winning documentary 
 Yad Vashem article
 Photo of Luca's shirt held by Pechersky's daughter

1909 births
1990 deaths
People from Kremenchuk
People from Kremenchugsky Uyezd
Jews from the Russian Empire
Ukrainian Jews
Gulag detainees
Jewish escapees from Nazi concentration camps
Jewish partisans
Prisoners and detainees of the Soviet Union
Soviet Jews in the military
Jewish resistance members during the Holocaust
Sobibor extermination camp survivors
Soviet military personnel of World War II
Soviet partisans
Belarusian partisans
Soviet prisoners of war
Soviet military personnel of World War II from Ukraine
World War II prisoners of war held by Germany